Jan-Christian Söderholm (born 7 December 1976 in Stockholm) is a Finnish actor. He graduated as Master of Arts in Theatre and Drama at the Theatre Academy of Finland in 2003. He has been working in several Finnish and Swedish speaking theatre and movie productions in Finland.

Partial filmography 
 Beyond the Front Line (Etulinjan edessä / Framom främsta linjen, 2004)
 The Mist (Sumu, 2007)
 Tali-Ihantala 1944 (2007)

External links 

 https://janchristiansoderholm.com

1976 births
Finnish male actors
Living people
Male actors from Stockholm